Rashad Harden (October 9, 1979 – April 26, 2014), known as DJ Rashad, was a Chicago-based electronic musician, producer and DJ known as a pioneer in the footwork genre and founder of the Teklife crew. He released his debut studio album Double Cup on Hyperdub in 2013 to critical praise. He died in April 2014 from a drug overdose.

Biography

Career
Born in Hammond, Indiana on October 1, 1979, Rashad Hanif Harden was the son of Gloria and Anthony Harden. He grew up on 159th Street in the southern part of Calumet City, a suburb of Chicago. He developed an early interest in music and began to DJ in his early teens, influenced by house and juke. In high school, Harden gained further DJ experience at the Kennedy-King College radio station WKKC. He also became a member of local dance troupes, including the HouseOMatics, The Phyrm, and Wolf Pac. In 1992 he made his first public appearance as a DJ at his high school dance party jubilation.

While attending Thornwood High School, Harden met Morris Harper (aka DJ Spinn) during homeroom class. The two began to spend time at each other's houses producing tracks and performing at parties. Harden was one of the founders of the Teklife crew and developed the footwork style around dance battles in the Chicago metropolitan area. His first recording released to vinyl was the track "Child Abuse" on Dance Mania in 1998. He gained further global attention after releasing his single "Itz Not Rite" on Planet Mu and being included on their Bangs and Works album in 2010.

In 2013, Harden released the EPs I Don't Give a Fuck and Rollin''' on Kode9's Hyperdub label. These were followed by the debut full-length album Double Cup (2013), which featured collaborations with DJ Spinn, Taso, DJ Phil, Manny, Earl and Addison Groove. He was one of the performers at the Pitchfork Music Festival in Chicago in 2013 and completed support-slot on the tour of Chance the Rapper in December 2013. His last performance as a DJ was at Club Vinyl in Denver, CO on April 24, 2014.

Death
On Saturday, April 26, 2014, Harden was found dead at an apartment on West 21st Street, Chicago. An autopsy confirmed that the death was drug related, with heroin, cocaine and alprazolam (Xanax) being found in Rashad's system.

A variety of artists paid tribute to Rashad, with Vice writing that "Rashad will undoubtedly be remembered as one of contemporary dance music's most innovative stylists and most irreplaceable presences." On June 29, 2015, Hyperdub released the 6613 EP, a four-track EP of previously unheard tracks by DJ Rashad. Afterlife was Harden's last album. It featured previously unreleased songs in collaboration with other members of the Teklife crew. It was released on April 8, 2016, as the first release of the new Teklife Records label.

Discography
Albums
 Juke Trax Online Vol. 3 (2006)
 Something 2 Dance 2 (2008)
 Just a Taste Vol. One (2011)
 Teklife Volume 1 – Welcome to the Chi (2012)
 Double Cup (2013)
 Afterlife (2016)

 Singles and EPs 
 2004: "Girl Bust Down" (with DJ Spinn; Juke Trax)
 2004: The White Tees EP (with DJ TY; Juke Trax)
 2007: "Jukestacy" (Juke Trax Online)
 2007: "Send It Up" (Juke Trax Online)
 2007: "Get It Shorty" (Juke Trax Online)
 2008: "We Break It Down" (with DJ Chi Boogie; Juke Trax Online)
 2008: "You Know What It Is" (Juke Trax Online)
 2008: Juke Trax Online Vol. 13 (Juke Trax Online)
 2008: "Imma Do Me" (Juke Trax Online)
 2008: "Freakin Me on the Flo" (Juke Trax Online)
 2008: "Tek-9" (Databass Online)
 2010: "Grace" (Ghettophiles)
 2010: "4 the Ghetto" (with DJ Spinn; Ghettophiles)
 2010: "Itz Not Rite" (Planet Mu)
 2011: "Meet Tshetsha Boys" (with DJ Spinn and RP Boo; Honest Jon's Records)
 2013: I Don't Give a Fuck (Hyperdub)
 2013: "Its Wack" (Grand Theft Auto V)
 2013: Rollin' (Hyperdub)
 2014: "We on 1" (Southern Belle Recordings)
 2014: "Don't This Ish" (with Alix Perez and DJ Spinn, Exit Records/Mixmag'')
 2014: "Make It Worth" (with Alix Perez and DJ Spinn, Exit Records)
 2015: "6613" (Hyperdub)

See also
The Era (footwork dance crew)

References

External links

1979 births
2014 deaths
African-American DJs
American electronic musicians
Cocaine-related deaths in Illinois
Musicians from Chicago
Hyperdub artists
People from Calumet City, Illinois
20th-century African-American people
21st-century African-American people
Electronic dance music DJs
Deaths by heroin overdose in the United States